The Albin 57 is a Swedish trailerable sailboat that was designed by Rolf Magnusson as a coastal cruiser and first built in 1977.

The boat's designation is its metric length overall in decimetres.

Production
The design was built by Albin Marine in Sweden between 1977 and 1981, with about 400 boats completed, but it is now out of production.

Design
The Albin 57 is a recreational keelboat, built predominantly of fibreglass, with wood trim. It has a fractional sloop rig with aluminum spars, wire standing rigging and a single set of swept spreaders. The hull has a raked stem, a plumb transom, a transom-hung rudder controlled by a tiller and a swing keel. It displaces  and carries  of ballast.

The boat is normally fitted with a small outboard motor for docking and manoeuvring.

The design has sleeping accommodation for four people, with a double "V"-berth in the bow cabin and two straight settees in the main cabin. The galley is located at the companionway ladder. The galley is equipped with a two-burner stove. There are hull-mounted rectangular ports on both sides of the boat.

Operational history
At one time the boat was supported by a class club that organized racing events, Albin 57 Owners Association, but it seem to be no longer existent.

See also
List of sailing boat types

References

External links
Video: Sailing an Albin 57

Keelboats
1970s sailboat type designs
Sailing yachts
Trailer sailers
Sailboat type designs by Rolf Magnusson
Sailboat types built by Albin Marine